Froebel's International School is a network of private schools in Pakistan with branches in some major cities of the country. It is considered as an elite school of Pakistan.

History
It was founded in 1975 by Sabiha Zamir Khan, the widow of Admiral Zamir. In 1981, Froebel's acquired a 6,000 square yard plot at Rs70 per square yard in Sector F-7/2 of Islamabad to develop a new school branch.

In September 2013, a student from Froebel's International School Islamabad broke the world record by scoring 47 A's in his O and A level examinations.

Froebel's Model United Nations (FROMUN) is held on annual basis at Islamabad campus.

Branches
 Froebel's International School F-7 branch

 Froebel's International School Peshawar Road Rawalpindi branch

Notable alumni
 Bilawal Bhutto Zardari
 Haroon Tariq  
 Mudassar Hussain

References

External links
 

Educational institutions established in 1975
Schools in Islamabad
Academic institutions in Pakistan
Private schools in Pakistan
1975 establishments in Pakistan